Marko Popović may refer to:

Marko Miljanov Popović (1833–1901), Montenegrin-Serbian general and writer
Marko Popović (basketball, born 1982), Croatian point guard/shooting guard
Marko Popović (basketball, born 1984), Serbian and Bosnian point guard 
Marko Popović (basketball, born 1985), Montenegrin shooting guard
Marko Popović (footballer) (born 1982), Serbian soccer player
Marko Popović (volleyball) (born 1994), Serbian player for club OK Partizan